RAF Turnberry was an airfield in Scotland  used by the Royal Flying Corps (RFC) and the Royal Air Force (RAF) during the First World War, and again by the RAF in the Second World War. Between the two wars, the site reverted to its pre-1914 use as the Turnberry Golf Course and hotel. It reverted to this use again after the Second World War. Although there is still a disused landing strip, the site is now the Trump Turnberry.

History

First World War
In WWI Turnberry housed No. 1 School of Aerial Fighting (Loch Doon, to the east, was used for a School of Aerial Gunnery). The school merged with No. 2 (Auxiliary) School of Air Gunnery, becoming No. 1 School of Aerial Fighting and Gunnery, renamed No. 1 Fighting School (North-West Area) on 29 May 1918. It provided pilots with three-week courses in the arts of aerial gunnery and combat. It was disbanded on 25 January 1919. The Turnberry Hotel was used during the war as a hospital for the wounded.

Inter war period
Following the end of the conflict, all land and property requisitioned for military purposes was returned to civilian ownership. Golf courses 1 and 2 were rebuilt and renamed "Ailsa" and "Arran". A memorial honouring lost airmen at Turnberry was erected on the hill overlooking the 12th green of Ailsa.

Second World War
With outbreak of the Second World War, the hotel was again commissioned by the British government as a hospital, and the golf courses were requisitioned for air training for the Royal Air Force. RAF Coastal Command based Consolidated Liberators there for anti-submarine patrols over the Atlantic. The base was also used for training Bristol Beaufighter and Bristol Beaufort crews. Testing of Barnes Wallis's "Highball" bouncing bomb was also performed by 618 Squadron, flying from Turnberry. As Turnberry hotel was used a Royal Navy hospital, as many as 200 patients died at the base.  In 1943, Bruce Forsyth's older brother John, who was serving as a pilot in the RAF, was killed during a training exercise at the base.

The following units were based at Turnberry:
 No. 5 Operational Training Unit RAF (May - December 1942)
 No. 10 Gliding School RAF (May 1945 - January 1948)
 No. 254 Squadron RAF
 Coastal Command Flying Instructors School RAF (June - October 1945) became[Coastal Command Instructors School RAF (October - November 1945)
 Torpedo Training Unit RAF (November 1942 - January 1943) became No. 1 Torpedo Training Unit RAF (January 1943 - May 1944)

References

Citations

Bibliography

External links 
The Ayrshire airfield that helped shape the fledgling RAF Alison Campsie, The Scotsman, 31 March 2018.

Royal Air Force stations of World War I in the United Kingdom
Royal Air Force stations of World War II in the United Kingdom
Royal Air Force stations in Scotland
Royal Air Force stations in Ayrshire
Defunct airports in Scotland